Dunnion is a surname. Notable people with the surname include:

Barry Dunnion, Irish sportsperson
Kristyn Dunnion (born 1969), Canadian fiction writer and performance artist